The 1970 Victorian Football Association season was the 89th season of the top division of the Australian rules football competition, and the tenth season of second division competition. The Division 1 premiership was won by the Prahran Football Club, marking the club's third Division 1 premiership; it defeated Williamstown, which qualified for the Grand Final in its first season after promotion to Division 1, on 20 September by 50 points. The Division 2 premiership was won by Coburg, in its second season since being relegated from Division 1.

Division 1
The Division 1 home-and-home season was played over 18 rounds; the top four then contested the finals under the Page–McIntyre system. The finals returned to the St Kilda Cricket Ground for the first time since 1966.

Ladder

Finals

Awards
The leading goalkicker for the third consecutive season was Jim Miller (Dandenong), who kicked 80 goals in the home-and-away season and did not participate in finals.
The J. J. Liston Trophy was won by Fred Cook (Yarraville). Cook, who later became the Association's all-time leading goalkicker, won the award as Yarraville's first choice ruckman and compared with the rest of his career kicked relatively few goals during the year; he polled 41 votes and won the award by a wide margin of 14 votes, despite Yarraville winning only one game for the season. Kevin Jackman (Williamstown) was second with 27 votes, and Derek King (Oakleigh) finished third with 22 votes.
Port Melbourne won the seconds premiership. Port Melbourne 16.18 (114) defeated Preston 14.9 (93) in the Grand Final, played as a stand-alone match on Saturday 12 September at Toorak Park.

Division 2
The Division 2 home-and-home season was played over eighteen rounds; the top four then contested the finals under the Page–McIntyre system; all finals were played on Sundays at Toorak Park.

Ladder

Finals

Awards
The leading goalkicker for Division 2 was George Allen (Sunshine), who kicked 73 goals in the home-and-away season, and 80 goals overall.
The J. J. Field Medal was won by Greg Smith (Mordialloc), who polled 39 votes. Smith finished ahead of Bob Kirkman (Coburg), who was second with 33 votes.
Northcote won the seconds premiership. Northcote 15.19 (109) defeated Sunshine 13.14 (92) in the Grand Final, held as a stand-alone match on Saturday 29 August at Skinner Reserve.

Notable events
On 16 March, the Association was formally expelled from the Australian National Football Council as punishment for its refusal to establish a clearance reciprocity agreement with the Victorian Football League during the previous season. The expulsion passed by a vote of 6–3, and brought an end to the Association's twenty-year affiliation with the national body. As a consequence of the expulsion, the League was now free under ANFC rules to field Association players without a permit; likewise the Association could field League players without a permit, but it had already been doing so against ANFC rules.
Prior to the season, the Broadmeadows Football Club submitted an application to join the Association; but the application was rejected because Association was not interested in expanding beyond twenty teams.
On 26 April, Prahran defeated Preston to end Preston's 18-match winning streak.
The final round in Division 1 saw one of the closest finishes to the home-and-away in Association history, with five teams – Sandringham, Port Melbourne, Dandenong, Waverley and Preston – battling in the final round for the last two positions in the final four. In the final round:
Sandringham, which could have claimed third place with a victory, suffered a heavy loss against Williamstown, trailing by 57 points at quarter time before losing by 41 points
Port Melbourne defeated Dandenong by 13 points to claim third place from Sandringham on percentage, and leave Dandenong out of the finals by four premiership points
Waverley defeated Oakleigh by 93 points to claim fourth place from Sandringham on percentage
Preston defeated Geelong West by 32 points, falling 0.5%pts short of passing Sandringham on percentage for fifth place; the percentage gap to Waverley for fourth place was in any case insurmountable, so Waverley's win eliminated Preston from finals contention.
Williamstown reached the Division 1 Grand Final in its first season after promotion from Division 2. It was the best performance by a team in its first season after promotion in the history of Division 2.

External links
List of VFA/VFL premiers

References

Victorian Football League seasons
VFL